Clarence Leonidas Fender (August 10, 1909 – March 21, 1991) was an American inventor known for designing the Fender Stratocaster. He also founded the Fender Musical Instruments Corporation. In January 1965, he sold Fender to CBS, and later founded two other musical instrument companies, Music Man and G&L Musical Instruments.

The guitars, basses, and amplifiers he designed from the 1940s on are still widely used: the Fender Telecaster (1950) was the first mass-produced solid-body electric guitar; the Fender Stratocaster (1954) is among the most iconic electric guitars; the Fender Precision Bass (1951) set the standard for electric basses, and the Fender Bassman amplifier, popular in its own right, became the basis for later amplifiers (notably by Marshall and Mesa Boogie) that dominated rock and roll music.

Leo Fender was inducted into the Rock and Roll Hall of Fame in 1992. His instruments were played by many Rock and Roll Hall of Fame inductees such as Jimi Hendrix, Jeff Beck, Eric Clapton, Ritchie Blackmore, Curtis Mayfield, Joe Walsh, Bonnie Raitt, Muddy Waters, Neal Schon, Jerry Garcia, Billy Gibbons, Eddie Hazel, James Burton, Steve Cropper, Frank Zappa, Keith Richards, David Gilmour, Pete Townshend, Buddy Guy, Jimmy Page, Duane Allman, and Stevie Ray Vaughan. Fender never learned to play the instruments.

Biography

Early life
Clarence Leonidas Fender ("Leo") was born on August 10, 1909, to Clarence Monte Fender and Harriet Elvira Wood, owners of a successful orange grove located between Anaheim and Fullerton, California, United States.

At the age of 8 years, Leo developed a tumor in his left eye, resulting in the eye being removed and being replaced with a glass eye, making him ineligible for the draft in World War II later in life.

While he was young he played piano, and then switched to saxophone. However, his interest in saxophone did not last long as he focused more and more on electronics.

From an early age, Fender showed an interest in tinkering with electronics. When he was 13 years old, his uncle, who ran an automotive-electric shop, sent him a box filled with discarded car radio parts, and a battery. The following year, Leo visited his uncle's shop in Santa Maria, California, and was fascinated by a radio his uncle had built from spare parts and placed on display in the front of the shop. Leo later claimed that the loud music coming from the speaker of that radio made a lasting impression on him. Soon thereafter, Leo began repairing radios in a small shop in his parents' home.

In the spring of 1928, Fender graduated from Fullerton Union High School, and entered Fullerton Junior College that fall, as an accounting major. While he was studying to be an accountant, he continued to teach himself electronics, and tinker with radios and other electrical items but never took any kind of electronics course.

After college, Fender took a job as a delivery man for Consolidated Ice and Cold Storage Company in Anaheim, where he was later made the bookkeeper. It was around this time that a local band leader approached him, asking if he could build a public address system (PA) for use by the band at dances in Hollywood. Fender was contracted to build six of these PA systems.

In 1933, Fender met Esther Klosky, and they were married in 1934. About that time, he took a job as an accountant for the California Highway Department in San Luis Obispo. In a depression government change, his job was eliminated, and he then took a job in the accounting department of a tire company. After working there for six months, Fender lost his job along with the other accountants in the company.

Fender Radio Service
In 1938, with a borrowed $600, Leo and Esther returned to Fullerton, and Leo started his own radio repair shop, "Fender Radio Service". Soon, musicians and band leaders began coming to him for public address systems, which he built, rented, and sold. They also visited his store for amplification for the amplified acoustic guitars that were beginning to show up on the southern California music scene –  in big band and jazz music, and for the electric "Hawaiian" or "lap steel" guitars becoming popular in country music.

Early guitar builds
During World War II, Fender met Clayton Orr "Doc" Kauffman, an inventor and lap steel player who had worked for Rickenbacker, which had been building and selling lap steel guitars for a decade. While with Rickenbacker, Kauffman had invented the "Vibrola" tailpiece, a precursor to the later vibrato tailpiece. Fender convinced him that they should team up, and they started the "K&F Manufacturing Corporation" to design and build amplified Hawaiian guitars and amplifiers. In 1944, Fender and Kauffman patented a lap steel guitar with an electric pickup already patented by Fender. In 1945, they began selling the guitar in a kit with an amplifier designed by K&F. In 1946, Doc pulled out of K&F and Fender revised the company and renamed it "Fender Manufacturing", and then later "Fender Electric Instrument Co." at the end of 1947 and he handed over the reins of his radio shop to Dale Hyatt.

Development of the electric guitar: Esquire/Broadcaster/Telecaster
As the Big Bands fell out of vogue towards the end of World War II, small combos playing boogie-woogie, rhythm and blues, western swing, and honky-tonk formed throughout the United States. Many of these outfits embraced the electric guitar because it could give a few players the power of an entire horn section. Pickup-equipped archtops were the guitars of choice in the dance bands of the late 1940s, but the increasing popularity of roadhouses and dance halls created a growing need for louder, cheaper, and more durable instruments. Players also needed 'faster' necks and better intonation to play what the country players called "take-off lead guitar." In the late 1940s, solid-body electric guitars began to rise in popularity, yet they were still considered novelty items, with the Rickenbacker Spanish Electro guitar being the most commercially available solid-body, and  Les Paul's one-off home-made "Log" and the Bigsby Travis guitar made by Paul Bigsby for Merle Travis being the most visible early examples.

Fender recognized the potential for an electric guitar that was easy to hold, tune, and play, and would not feed back at dance hall volumes as the typical archtop would. In 1948, he finished the prototype of a thin solid-body electric; it was first released in 1950 as the Fender Esquire (with a solid body and one pickup), and renamed first Broadcaster and then Telecaster (with two pickups) the year after. The Telecaster, originally equipped with two single-coil pickups and widely used among country and western players, became one of the most popular electric guitars in history.

Stratocaster
Instead of updating the Telecaster, Fender decided, based on customer feedback, to leave the Telecaster as it was and design a new, upscale solid-body guitar to sell alongside the basic Telecaster. Western swing guitarist Bill Carson was one of the chief critics of the Telecaster, stating that the new design should have individually adjustable bridge saddles, four or five pickups, a vibrato unit that could be used in either direction and return to proper tuning, and a contoured body for enhanced comfort over the slab-body Telecaster's harsh edges. Fender, assisted by draftsman Freddie Tavares, began designing the Stratocaster in late 1953. It included a rounder, less "club-like" neck (at least for the first year of issue) and a double cutaway for easier reach to the upper registers.

Another novelty to the Stratocaster design included the use of three pickups wired to offer three different voicings, two of which could be further tailored by the player by adjusting the two tone controls. This was the first electric guitar on the market to offer three pickups and a tremolo arm (which was actually used for vibrato, not tremolo), which became widely used by guitarists. The three pickups could be selected using the standard three-way switch to give the guitar different sound and options by using the "neck", "middle" or "bridge" pickups. Though Leo Fender preferred the sound of single pickups, guitarists discovered they could get the switch to stay between the detent positions and activate two pickups at once. The five-way switch was finally implemented as a factory option in late 1976, adding the detent combinations of neck+middle or bridge+middle that musicians had been using for years.

Electric Basses: Precision, Jazz
During this time, Fender also tackled the problems experienced by players of the acoustic double bass, who could no longer compete for volume with the other musicians. Besides, double basses were also large, bulky, and difficult to transport. With the Precision Bass (or "P-Bass"), released in 1951, Leo Fender addressed both issues: the Telecaster-based Precision Bass was small and portable, and its solid-body construction and four-magnet, single coil pickup let it play at higher volumes without feedback. Along with the Precision Bass (so named because its fretted neck allowed bassists to play with 'precision'), Fender introduced a bass amplifier, the Fender Bassman, a 25-watt amplifier with one 15-inch speaker (later updated to 45 watts and four 10-inch speakers).

1954 saw an update of the Precision Bass to coincide with the introduction of the Stratocaster. Incorporating some of the body contours of the Stratocaster, the update also included a two-section nickel-plated bridge and a white single-layer pickguard.

In June 1957, Fender announced a redesign of the Precision Bass. The remake included a larger headstock, a new pickguard design, a bridge with four steel saddles that could be individually adjusted and a new split single-coil pickup. This proved to be the final version of the instrument, which has changed little since then. In 1960, rosewood fingerboards, wider color selections and a three-ply pickguard became available for the P-Bass.

1960 saw the release of the Jazz Bass, a sleeker, updated bass with a slimmer neck, and offset waist body and two single coil pickups (as opposed to the Precision Bass and its split-humbucking pickup that had been introduced in 1957). Like its predecessor, the Jazz Bass (or simply "J-Bass") was an instant hit and has remained popular to this day, and early models are highly sought after by collectors.

1970 – Music Man and G&L
In the 1950s, Leo Fender contracted a streptococcal sinus infection that impaired his health to the point where he decided to wind up his business affairs, selling the Fender company to CBS in 1965. As part of this deal, Leo Fender signed a non-compete clause and remained a consultant with Fender for a while. Shortly after selling the company, he changed doctors and was cured of his illness.  In 1971, Forrest White and Tom Walker formed the Tri-Sonix company (often incorrectly referred to as "Tri-Sonic"), based in Santa Ana, California. Walker and White went to Leo to help finance their company and it evolved into 'Music Man', a name Leo Fender preferred over their name, Tri-Sonix. After considerable financing, in 1975, Fender became its president.

The StingRay bass was an innovative early instrument. Though the body design borrowed heavily from the Precision Bass, the StingRay is largely considered the first production bass with active electronics. The StingRay's two-band active equalizer, high-output humbucking pickup, and high-gloss finished neck became a favorite of many influential bassists, including Louis Johnson, Bernard Edwards, John Deacon, Ben Orr, John Taylor, Tony Levin, Pino Palladino, Kim Deal, Tim Commerford, Gail Ann Dorsey and Flea. Later, a three-band active equalizer was introduced on the StingRay. Music Man was active in making amplifiers as well, but the HD-130 Reverb, designed to compete with the Twin Reverb, came at a time when the clean sounds of the Twin were going out of fashion.

In 1979, Leo Fender and old friends George Fullerton and Dale Hyatt started a new company called G&L (George & Leo) Musical Products. G&L guitar designs tended to lean heavily upon the looks of Fender's original guitars such as the Stratocaster and Telecaster, but incorporated innovations such as enhanced tremolo systems and electronics.

In 1979, Fender's wife Esther died of cancer. He remarried in 1980; his second wife Phyllis Fender became an Honorary Chairman of G&L. Despite suffering several minor strokes, Fender continued to produce guitars and basses. On March 21, 1991, he died, having long suffered from Parkinson's disease. He was buried at Fairhaven Memorial Park in Santa Ana, California, next to his first wife Esther. His accomplishments for "contributions of outstanding technical significance to the recording field" were acknowledged with a Technical Grammy Award in 2009. Fender Avenue in Fullerton, California was named after him.

Phyllis Fender died on July 22, 2020.

References

External links

 Fender Musical Instruments website
 G&L Guitars website
 Phyllis Fender Interview – NAMM Oral History Library (2003)

1909 births
1991 deaths
American musical instrument makers
Guitar makers
Deaths from Parkinson's disease
Neurological disease deaths in California
American luthiers
People from Fullerton, California
Fender people